Karel Pečko (September 29, 1920 – May 2, 2016) was a Slovenian academic painter and cultural worker.

Life and work

Karel Pečko received his degree in fine arts by graduating under Gojmir Anton Kos from the Ljubljana Academy of Fine Arts and Design in 1954. From 1954 to 1962, he taught art in primary and secondary school in Slovenj Gradec. In 1957 he established an arts pavilion alongside his teaching duties. In 1963, he became the school's principal. From 1975 to 1991 he headed a cultural institute in Slovenj Gradec. He also led the Slovenj Gradec Art Gallery until 1997. He designed the exhibition programme and invited fine arts critics to participate as selectors, which was unusual in Slovene galleries in the 1960s. Pečko wished to give Slovenj Gradec a cosmopolitan character with the help of the fine arts. In addition to painting, Pečko also designed ceramics, stage props, mosaics, and showcases, worked in graphic design, and also taught other artists. He exhibited his artwork in many joint and individual exhibitions in Slovenj Gradec and abroad. He lived and worked in Slovenj Gradec. Pečko died in Slovenj Gradec  on May 2, 2016 at the age of 95.

Awards
He received multiple awards for his work in the arts and for his contribution to the gallery. Among his awards is the Honorary Medal of Freedom of the Republic of Slovenia (1996), which is the highest award in Slovenia and is conferred by the president of Slovenia.

References

External links 
 Slovenj Gradec Art Gallery

1920 births
2016 deaths
People from the Municipality of Radlje ob Dravi
Slovenian artists
University of Ljubljana alumni
Yugoslav artists